Hans Koning (born Hans Königsberger, since 1949 officially Hans Konigsberger; July 12, 1921 – April 13, 2007) was a Dutch author of over 40 fiction and non-fiction books, was also a prolific journalist, contributing for almost 60 years to many periodicals including The New York Times, International Herald Tribune, Atlantic Monthly, The Nation, Harper's, The New Yorker, and De Groene Amsterdammer. He used the pen name Hans Koningsberger (with an added letter 'n'), and from 1972 Hans Koning.

Biography 
Born in Amsterdam in 1921 to Elisabeth van Collem (daughter of socialist poet Abraham Eliazer van Collem) and David Königsberger, he was educated at the University of Amsterdam 1939-41, the University of Zurich 1941-43, and the Sorbonne in 1946.

Escaping the occupied Netherlands with the Resistance (he was a wearer of the Dutch Resistance Cross), he was one of the youngest sergeants in the British Army, 7 Troop, 4 Commando, working as an interpreter during the allied occupation of Germany at the end of the war.

As an editor of De Groene Amsterdammer, a Dutch weekly, 1947–50, he was invited to run a cultural program on Radio Jakarta,  Indonesia which he did from 1950-51. It was after this that he came by freighter to the United States. His first novel, The Affair, was published in 1958. He also began writing non-fiction, including several travel books, including Love and Hate in China (1966).

During the Vietnam War he turned his attention to protest, helping to found the still-active 'RESIST' organization in Cambridge, Massachusetts, with Noam Chomsky among others.  He was also a creative writing professor at Boston University between 1971-72.

For the next thirty years he wrote fiction and non-fiction and was a two-time recipient of a National Endowment for the Arts fellowship for creative writers, for fiction. Four of his novels were made into films: A Walk with Love and Death, which was Anjelica Huston's first film, directed by her father, John Huston; The Revolutionary, starring Jon Voight; Death of a Schoolboy, for BBC London, and The Petersburg-Cannes Express.

From 2000 to 2006 he also found time to run Literary Discord, a radio program broadcast by WPKN Bridgeport, dedicated to discussing such literature and the state of publishing in the United States. He interviewed, among many others, Russel Banks and Sadi Ranson about the state of publishing in the United States.

Fiction 
(Until 1972 writing under the name Hans Koningsberger)

The Affair, Alfred Knopf 1958, NewSouth Books 2002
An American Romance, Simon and Schuster 1960, NewSouth Books 2002
A Walk with Love and Death, Simon and Schuster 1961, NewSouth Books 2003
I Know What I'm Doing, Simon and Schuster 1964, NewSouth Books 2005
The Revolutionary: a novel, Farrar Straus Giroux 1967
Death of a Schoolboy, Harcourt Brace 1974
The Petersburg-Cannes Express, Harcourt Brace 1975, NewSouth Books 2004
America Made Me: A Novel, Thunder's Mouth Press 1979
The Kleber Flight, Atheneum 1981, NewSouth Books 2006
De Witt's war, Pantheon 1983
Acts of Faith, Henry Holt 1986
Pursuit of a Woman on the Hinge of History: A Novel, Lumen Editions, 1997
Zeeland or Elective Concurrences, NewSouth Books 2001
The Movie Actress, Dry Ice Pub. 2018

Many of his novels have also been published in other countries including England, the Netherlands, Spain, France, Italy, Germany, and Japan.

Non-fiction 

Love and Hate in China McGraw-Hill, 1966
Along the Roads of New Russia Farrar Straus Giroux 1967
World of Vermeer Time Life 1967
Amsterdam Time Life 1968. With photographs by Patrick Ward.
The Future of Che Guevara Doubleday 1971
The Almost World Dial Press 1972
A New Yorker in Egypt Harcourt Brace 1976
Nineteen Sixty-Eight: A Personal Report Norton 1987
Colon: el mito al descubierto. 1991
Columbus: His Enterprise: Exploding the Myth Monthly Review Press 1976, 1991
The Conquest of America: How the Indian Nations Lost Their Continent Monthly Review Press 1993
Hans Koning's Little Book of Comforts and Gripes 2000
Rene Burri Phaidon Press 2006

Film 
A Walk with Love and Death, 20th Century Fox 1969
The Revolutionary, United Artists 1970
Death of a Schoolboy, BBC 1990
The Petersburg-Cannes Express, John Daly 2003

Plays 
The Blood-Red Cafe
Hermione
A Woman of New York

Children's books 

The Golden Keys Doubleday 1956, 1970

Translations 

The Ten Thousand Things by Maria Dermout (Dutch) New York Review of Books 2002
Carlo Coccioli, Manual the Mexican (French) Simon and Schuster
The Islands by A. Alberts Tuttle Co. 1999

Obituaries

References

External links 

1921 births
2007 deaths
American male novelists
Writers from Amsterdam
Dutch resistance members
Dutch emigrants to the United States
20th-century Dutch novelists
20th-century American male writers
20th-century American novelists
21st-century American writers
University of Amsterdam alumni
University of Zurich alumni
University of Paris alumni
Dutch male novelists